Gomanj-e Olya (also romanized as Gomānj-e ‘Olyā and Gamanj Olya; also known as Gomānab, Gomānj Bālā, Gomānj-e Bālā, Gomyānāb, Gumianāb, Gyumyanab, Kamanj-e Bālā, Kamānj-e ‘Olyā, Komānch Bālā, Komānj Bālā, and Kūmīnyāb) is a village in Esperan Rural District, in the Central District of Tabriz County, East Azerbaijan Province, Iran. At the 2006 census, its population was 314, in 86 families.

References 

Populated places in Tabriz County